Tenali Ramakrishna (born Garlapati Ramakrishna; also known as Tenali Rama)( Telugu: తెనాలి రామకృష్ణ కవి  / తెనాలి రామలింగడు/ తెనాలి రామకృష్ణుడు )was an Indian poet, scholar, thinker and a special advisor in the court of the Vijayanagar king Krishnadevaraya, who ruled from C.E. 1509 to 1529. He was a Telugu poet who hailed from a village called Tenali located at what is now the Andhra Pradesh region, generally known for the folk tales which focus on his wit. He was one of the Ashtadiggajas or the eight poets at the court of Krishnadevaraya.

His father died when he was a child. To overcome the depression that Rama faced, his mother Lakṣamma took him to Vijayanagar where he became an advisor to Sri Krishnadevaraya and the 8th scholar in his court. He was a great scholar and poet of Telugu language. Tenali Ramakrishna was also a minister of the court.

The Life of Rāmakr̥ṣṇa 
Tenali Rama was born in a Telugu speaking Niyogi Hindu Brahmin family as Garlapati Ramakrishna, in a village called Thumuluru or Tenali (currently a part of Tenali Maṇḍalam) during the late part of the fifteenth century. His father was Garlapathi Rama, who served as a priest in the Ramalingesvara Swami temple in Santharavuru.

Rama died when Ramakrishna was young. His mother Lakṣamma returned to her native place in Tenāli to live with her brother. Ramakrishna grew up in his uncle's town and so came to be known as Tenali Ramakrishna.

Tenāli Rāmakr̥ṣṇa did not receive any formal education during his childhood, but became a great scholar, due to his thirst for knowledge. As per a well-known tale, the Vaishnava (devotees of Vishnu) scholars rejected to accept him as a disciple, as he was a Śaiva. Ramakrishna was still determined to get educated so he went to many paṇḍits and begged them humbly to accept him as his disciple but they called him names and threw him out. Later while roaming aimlessly, he met a sage, who advised him to worship the Goddess Kali. He worshipped and invoked the Goddess with his devotion. Legends say that Maa Kali appeared before him and admired his sense of humor and blessed him that one day, he would be acclaimed as a great poet in the imperial court of emperor Krishnadevaraya of Vijayanagara. The Goddess also gave him the title "Vikaṭakavi", impressed by his wit and humor. His wife was Saarada and son was Bhaskara sarma.

King's court 
Ramakrishna held an  important position in Krishnadevaraya's court. He was one of the Ashtadiggajas and chief adviser appointed by the emperor.

Later years 

A year before the death of Krishnadevaraya, in 1528 Tenali Ramakrishna died from a snakebite. The records also state that Ramakrishna was instrumental in protecting the emperor many times, coming to his rescue in critical situations, doing court cases, and he was his best friend.

Literary works 
Tenali Rama was noted for his brilliance and wit. Tenali Ramakrishna's great work Panduranga Mahatmyam  is a Kāvya of high merit, remarkable for its sonorous dignity of phrasing, and is counted as one of the Pañcha Mahā Kāvyas (the Five Great Kavyas) of Telugu literature. It contains a legendary account of a shrine of Vishnu as Panduranga, at Pandharpur consecrated by the ministration of Saint Pundarika. A brahmin named Nigama Sharma, who wasted his life in dissipation and debauchery, died in Pandharpur. A controversy ensures between servants of Yama and servants of Vishnu. The former were anxious to carry him to hell as he lived a wicked life and the latter claimed him for heaven, as he died in that sacred place. Indeed, the verdict is in favour of the servants of Vishnu
Tenali took the theme for Panduranga Mahatmyam from the Skanda Purana and enhanced it with many stories about the devotees of Panduranga. An imaginary character named 'Nigama Sarma Akka' was created by Tenali Ramakrishna and he built a story around her without giving her a name. He also composed many extempore poems called 'Chatuvu'.

Tenali Ramakrishna attained the status of a folk hero when he was the court poet of Krishnadevaraya, but at the same time, he composed serious works on religion. Three of his narrative poems are available today. His first poem, Udbhataradhya Charitamu about the Shaiva teacher Udbhata which is based on Palakuriki Somanatha's Basava Puranam. Udbhataradhya Charitamu also deals with the sanctity of Varanasi. Because of Tenali Ramakrishna's affinity towards Shaivite religion, he was also known as Tenali Ramalinga Kavi.

Tenali Rama was called a Vikata Kavi (a palindrome in Telugu script) means clown-jester-poet. He was also entitled by "Kumara Bharathi", for his works.

In popular culture 
 Tenali Ramakrishna is a 1956 Telugu film directed by B. S. Ranga. This film was also made in Tamil and was renamed Tenali Raman. N. T. Rama Rao appeared as Sri Krishnadevaraya in both films while the title role was played by A. Nageswara Rao in Telugu and by Sivaji Ganesan in Tamil.
 Hasyaratna Ramakrishna is a 1982 Kannada film directed by B. S. Ranga. The film stars Anant Nag and Aarathi in the lead roles. In the film, Anant Nag plays the role of a poet, Ramakrishna.
 Tenali Rama, a 1990 Hindi TV series aired in Doordarshan made by T.S. Nagabharana in which Vijay Kashyap played the lead role. It was based on short-stories by Kamala Laxman.
 The Adventures of Tenali Raman, an animated series by Cartoon Network (India) in 2003.
 Tenaliraman is 2014 Tamil film featuring Vadivelu as Tenali Raman as well as Krishna Devaraya. The film was based on the comic reliefs of Tenali Raman.
 Rajguru Aur Tenaliram is an animated series which was aired on Star Utsav.
 Tenali Rama, is a TV series aired on SAB TV from 11 July 2017 to 13 November 2020, with Krishna Bharadwaj playing the titular role and Manav Gohil playing Krishnadevaraya

References

Book sources

External links 
 

 
Deaths due to snake bites
Telugu comedians
People of the Vijayanagara Empire
Jesters
16th-century Indian poets
Humour and wit characters of India
People from Guntur district
Indian male comedians
Male actors from Andhra Pradesh
Poets from Andhra Pradesh
Indian male poets
Vijayanagara poets
Scholars of Vijayanagara Empire